Neaerini is a tribe of flies in the family Tachinidae.

Genera
Neaera Robineau-Desvoidy, 1830

References

Brachyceran flies of Europe
Brachycera tribes
Tachininae